Bobby Vernon (born Sylvion de Jardin) (March 9, 1897 – June 28, 1939) was an American comedic actor in silent films. He later became a writer and comedy supervisor at Paramount for W. C. Fields and  Bing Crosby, when the sound era arrived. Blue-eyed with medium brown hair, he stood five feet and two-and-a-half inches, making him perfect for juvenile comedy roles. His comedies were popular with children.

Life and career
The Chicago-born son of entertainers Harry Burns and Dorothy Vernon (born Dorothy Baird), Bobby first worked as a newsboy in San Francisco. He was known as "Buttons," the singing newsboy. Sid Grauman recognized Vernon's talent and started him singing at the Empress Theatre at the age of eleven. Later, he became one of the stock actors in the vaudeville act Kolb and Dill. After three years of working with them, Max Dill broke his leg in their show, "The Rollicking Girl." At the age of sixteen, Vernon replaced him for three weeks.

His first experience in screen was at the age of sixteen in Universal Studios's Joker comedies. Early in his career, he was cast as an old man. By 1915, he began working for Keystone Studios. He starred in many romantic comedies with Gloria Swanson as his leading lady. The pair became popular for their great screen chemistry. However, as director Charley Chase recalled, Swanson was "frightened to death" of her co-star's dangerous stunts. He later described his Keystone days to Motion Picture Classic:

In December 1917, he began working for the Christie Film Company.

On September 9, 1918, Vernon left the Christie studio to serve during World War I at the submarine base at San Pedro, Los Angeles.

Vernon's career never progressed to feature films. He was busy making two-reel comedies. In a 1929 interview, he said:

A few months prior to the interview, he underwent a dangerous spine operation. The doctors claimed it was from years of taking falls.

Vernon sang and danced at Grauman's Theatre to great applause in February 1930.

Vernon completed his 12-year contract with the Christie Film Company in 1929. He then began freelancing. His first sound comedy was Cry Baby, directed by Del Lord in 1930. This was not his first sound film, as he made a brief cameo in The Voice of Hollywood #3 in 1929.

In 1933, after an acting career of 19 years, Vernon turned to writing. His last credited work in film was for Geronimo, released in 1940.

Family
Vernon married Angelina Repetto (1898-1981) of St. Louis, Missouri; the couple had one child, Barbara Dorothy Vernon, born in 1922. Angelina was the sister-in-law of Reggie Morris, thus making the two men brothers-in-law.

Death
Vernon died of a heart attack on June 28, 1939, in Hollywood, California, aged 42. He is interred at Forest Lawn Memorial Park in Glendale, California.

Partial filmography

 The Hungry Actors (1915)
 Fatty and the Broadway Stars (1915)
 A Dash of Courage (1916)
 Hearts and Sparks (1916)
 A Social Cub (1916)
 The Danger Girl (1916)
 Haystacks and Steeples (1916)
 The Nick of Time Baby (1916)
 Teddy at the Throttle (1917)
 Whose Baby? (1917)
 The Sultan's Wife (1917)
 Petticoats and Pants (1920)
 Why Wild Men Go Wild (1920)
 Fresh from the Farm (1921)
 Hey, Rube! (1921)
 Pure and Simple (1921)
 A Hickory Hick (1922)
 Choose Your Weapons (1922)
 Cornfed (1924)
 Reno Or Bust (1924)
 Broken China (1926)
 Cry Baby (1930)
 Sheer Luck (1931)
 He's a Honey (1932)
 Lone Cowboy (1933)

References

External links

 
 
 
 Bobby Vernon at Virtual History

1897 births
1939 deaths
American male screenwriters
American male stage actors
American male silent film actors
Male actors from Chicago
20th-century American male actors
Burials at Forest Lawn Memorial Park (Glendale)
20th-century American comedians
Comedians from Illinois
Screenwriters from Illinois
20th-century American male writers
20th-century American screenwriters